Mayfair High School is a middle and high school in the Bellflower Unified School District in the city of Lakewood, California. The school first opened in 1959. The student population is approximately 3616 in grades 7 through 12. Mayfair serves students in the cities of Lakewood, Bellflower, Cerritos, as well as other surrounding cities, though the students not from Cerritos, Bellflower, or Lakewood usually need special waivers to attend.

School info
The school mascot is the "Monsoons" and the logo is a vortex. School colors are white, blue, and grey. The school newspaper is called The Windjammer and the yearbook Tradewinds.

Demographics
The student population racial makeup in 2022 was 15.1% African-American, 0.3% American Indian or Alaskan Native, 10.9% Asian, 53.4% Hispanic or Latino, 1.2% Pacific Islander, 15.0% White (Not Hispanic) and 4.1% Multiple or No Response. The student population is approximately 1900+ in grades 7 through 12. Mayfair serves students in the cities of Lakewood, Bellflower, and Cerritos.

Awards
Mayfair is recognized as a California Distinguished School, the highest award a California high school can obtain. In 2001, Mayfair received the Golden Bell award from the California School Board Association for their Academy of Animation and Digital Art Program.

Athletics
Mayfair High School athletic teams participate in the Southern Section of CIF in the Suburban League with La Mirada, Norwalk, and Bellflower. The Monsoon athletic teams continue to be seen as dominant force within the Suburban League.

Notable alumni

Charles L. Beck (1971) – former Chief of the Los Angeles Police Department (LAPD).
Geri Reischl (1978) – singer and actor best known for playing Jan Brady on The Brady Bunch Hour.
Jay Gibbons (1995) – Major League Baseball outfielder.
Synyster Gates (1999) – lead guitarist of Avenged Sevenfold.
 Michael Bragg (1999) – defensive back in the NFL and CPIFL, played CFB for Texas A&M University–Kingsville
Josh Childress (2001) – former NBA basketball player for the Phoenix Suns. At Mayfair, Childress was selected as a McDonald's High School All-American.
Justin Turner (2002) – Infielder for the Los Angeles Dodgers and a NL All-Star.
Marque Richardson (2003) – USC alumni and an American actor/screenwriter.
Alterraun Verner (2006) – NFL cornerback
Tony Burnett (2008) – USC Trojans #34 (2012), San Diego Chargers (2013), CFL Linebacker #26 (Current)
Fou Fonoti – American football player
Patrick Christopher – NBA
Keenon Daequan Ray Jackson (2008) – rapper known as YG
Vince Staples - Rapper
Corey Bojorquez – punter for the Los Angeles Rams
Josh Christopher] (2020)– NBA - Current Team - The Houston Rockets

References

External links
 Mayfair High School home page

Public middle schools in California
High schools in Los Angeles County, California
Public high schools in California
Lakewood, California
1959 establishments in California
Educational institutions established in 1959